54 Synth-Brass, 38 Metal Guitar, 65 Cathedral is the ninth studio album by Shit and Shine, released on 16 March 2015 by Rocket Recordings. The album marries the cacophonous noise rock sound of their earlier work with modern dance music, while touching upon krautrock, jazz fusion, funk and electronic music.

Track listing

Personnel
Adapted from the 54 Synth-Brass, 38 Metal Guitar, 65 Cathedral liner notes.
Shit and Shine
 Craig Clouse – vocals, instruments

Release history

References

External links 
 
 54 Synth-Brass, 38 Metal Guitar, 65 Cathedral at Bandcamp

2015 albums
Shit and Shine albums